Bob Bryan and Mike Bryan successfully defended their title, defeating Marcin Matkowski and Jürgen Melzer in the final,  7–6(7–5), 5–7, [10–6].

Seeds
All seeds receive a bye into the second round.

Draw

Finals

Top half

Bottom half

References
 Main Draw

2014 BNP Paribas Masters